Lacon Brissett (born 21 May 1982) is a retired Jamaican football midfielder.

References

1982 births
Living people
Jamaican footballers
Wadadah F.C. players
Arnett Gardens F.C. players
Village United F.C. players
Rivoli United F.C. players
Montego Bay United F.C. players
Jamaica international footballers
Association football midfielders